Atomaria is a genus of silken fungus beetles in the family Cryptophagidae. There are more than 160 described species in Atomaria.

See also
 List of Atomaria species

References

Further reading

External links

 

Cryptophagidae
Articles created by Qbugbot